In Italian cuisine, a pan brioche is a kind of bread similar to a brioche. There are many variations of pan brioche, such as pan brioche dolce, pan brioche speziato, pan brioche salato, and pan brioche farcito.

Italian breads